Philippe Fragione (born 17 September 1968), better known by his stage name Akhenaton, is a French rapper and hip hop producer. He has also worked under the aliases Chill, AKH, Sentenza and Spectre. He is best known as member of hip hop group IAM and has since made a number of records, both with IAM and as a solo artist.

Akhenaton has worked as a producer, producing songs for several French rappers and groups such as Passi, Stomy Bugsy, Fonky Family, Freeman (a fellow member of IAM who has since made his break as a solo artist), La Brigade, Le 3ème Œil, etc. He is the creator of the record label Côté Obscur, the publishing house La Cosca and the vinyl record label 361.

Biography 
Akhenaton was born Philippe Fragione in Marseille in 1968 and spent his youth in Plan-de-Cuques, a small village on the outskirts of the city. His family is of Italian origins. His paternal grandmother, Immacolata Scotti, was of Campanian descent, his great-grandfather Francesco Fragione, emigrated from Sperlonga and on his maternal side a great-great-grandfather, Pierre Malano, emigrated from Porte, a great-great-great-grandfather Barthelemy Gionotti, emigrated from Camporgiano and another great-grandmother Maria Lanzarotti, emigrated from Bedonia. In 1981, he discovered hip hop music and started traveling frequently to New York City where he received the nickname "Chill Phil." At about the same time, back in Marseille, he met Éric Mazel, a DJ who would later be known as "Khéops". Mazel and Fragione started working together to advance the cause of French hip hop. 

In 1988, Fragione debuted as a hip hop theorist, publishing the essay La deuxième génération du hip-hop (The second generation of hip-hop) in the fanzine Vé. The same year, he appeared on the B-side of the US rapper MC Choice's single "Let's Make Some Noise". Having returned to Marseille, he met Geoffroy Mussard (Shurik'n) and Malek Brahimi (Freeman). Fragione became known as Akhenaton, and together with Khéops and Shurik'n formed the group B.Boys Stance, renamed IAM in 1989. The group was later joined by Freeman, Imhotep and Kephren.

Four of the six members of IAM chose ancient Egyptian names as stage names. Akhenaton converted to Islam from Catholicism. Musicologists argue that Akhenaton and the other members of IAM index the modern Arab world through the use of their names. Instead of overtly pointing out North African countries and the turmoil that has surrounded the contemporary Arab community, the Egyptian names allow the audience to covertly draw parallels between IAM and North Africa.

Instead of focusing on violence and rebellion like many other French rappers, Akhenaton and IAM remain true to their hometown, Marseille. In Marseille rap has reportedly remained relatively peaceful. Akhenaton posits that rappers in Marseille are more socially conscious because they feel a strong sense of community.

After IAM's first three albums' success, Akhenaton released his first solo album, Métèque et mat, in 1995. The album sold 300,000 copies and was followed by Sol Invictus in 2001. He began to delve into his other projects, such as producing Passi's album Les tentations (1997) and the 2001 film Comme un aimant. He continued working with IAM, releasing the album Revoir un printemps in 2003 and Saison 5 in 2007.

Discography

Albums 

Compilations
2000: Electro Cypher, compilation

Soundtracks

Singles 

*Did not appear in the official Belgian Ultratop 50 charts, but rather in the bubbling under Ultratip charts.

Featured in / collaborations

References 

1968 births
French rappers
Rappers from Bouches-du-Rhône
French former Christians
Converts to Islam from Roman Catholicism
Living people
French Muslims
French people of Italian descent
French people of Campanian descent
People of Lazian descent
People of Tuscan descent
People of Emilian descent
People of Piedmontese descent